Martha Jesús Mori Jipa (born 1 June 1979) is a Peruvian former footballer who played as a forward. She has been a member of the Peru women's national team.

International career
Mori capped for Peru at senior level during the 2003 South American Women's Football Championship.

International goals
Scores and results list Peru's goal tally first

References

External links

1979 births
Living people
Peruvian women's footballers
Peru women's international footballers
Women's association football forwards